Love Overflowing is the third studio album by Christian singer Sandi Patti, released in 1981 on Impact Records. It would be the beginning of her reign at the GMA Dove Awards as Female Vocalist of the Year as a title she would win for the next 11 years until 1992. The track "We Shall Behold Him" written by Dottie Rambo would be her signature song and a concert favorite as Patti has performed this at everyone of her concerts until her retirement from touring in 2016 and would win 2 Dove Awards for Song of the Year and Songwriter of the Year, both given to Rambo. In 1984, Love Overflowing climbed to No. 26 on the Top Christian Albums chart.Benson Records re-issued Love Overflowing on CD in 1987 with a new cover featuring a portrait painting of Patti. Word Records would use the same cover for their re-issue in 1990.

Track listing

Charts

Radio singles

Accolades
GMA Dove Awards
1982 Female Vocalist of the Year
1982 Artist of the Year

References

1981 albums
Sandi Patty albums
Impact Records albums
Word Records albums